Laos elects a legislature nationally and the public also participates in the election of village heads. The National Assembly (Sapha Heng Xat) has 164 members, elected for five year terms.

Laos is a one-party state. According to the constitution, elections are in accordance with the principles of democratic centralism and the Lao People's Revolutionary Party serves as the "leading nucleus" of the political system.

The last elections were held on 21 February 2021. The Lao People's Revolutionary Party (LPRP) took 158 seats in the 164-member National Assembly while the six remaining seats went to independents.

Latest election

References